Felix Femi Ajakaye (born 25 May 1962) is a Nigerian Catholic priest.

Life 
Ajakaye was born on 25 May 1962 in Ibadan. He was ordained a priest of the Diocese of Ekiti on 12 July 2008 and made the diocese's bishop on 17 April 2010. He saved Christians from being killed in Barkin Ladi .

Works 
Beyond Ideas (Y Books, Ibadan; 2016),

References

External links 

 State Of The Nation; A Clergyman's Concern 2018

1962 births
Living people
21st-century Roman Catholic bishops in Nigeria
Roman Catholic bishops of Ekiti